Hydrogen ATPase commonly refers to:

Hydrogen potassium ATPase, the gastric proton pump.
V-ATPase, the synaptic vesicle transporter.